Yoshida & Co., Ltd. is a Japanese manufacturer based in Tokyo that designs and produces bags and accessories. Founded by Kichizo Yoshida in 1935, the company is best known for its PORTER and LUGGAGE LABEL brands of products.

Producing "Japan Made" products, Yoshida & Co. gained popularity among young people in the 1980s for its low-key wallets, bags and backpacks. The company's most popular brand, PORTER, often collaborates with other fashion brands and consumer electronics companies to produce limited-edition products, examples of which have included cases and bags for Sony PSP, VAIO, and Apple PowerBook, and iPod products.

Yoshida & Co. distributes its products online and through over 700 stores worldwide, including three official company shops named Kura Chicka Yoshida located in Tokyo and Osaka, as well as in 28 Kura Chika partnership stores located domestically in Japan, and internationally in Hong Kong, Macau, and Taiwan.

Brands

Porter

Porter, branded in 1962, is the main brand of Yoshida & Co., Ltd. The name of the brand is taken from a "porter" who carries bags in a hotel.

Luggage Label
Luggage Label was launched in 1984. This brand is oriented to adults.

Porter Girl
Porter Girl, released in 2009, was the first women's oriented brand by Yoshida & Co., Ltd. There are many unisex Porter branded products, but Porter Girl adopts more feminine designs and fabrics.

Collaboration
The private brand, Head Porter, designed by Hiroshi Fujiwara selected Yoshida & Co., Ltd. as an OEM partner, and orders Yoshida & Co., Ltd. some of the branded products. The collaboration brand with Beams, Japanese fashion brand, is called B印YOSHIDA and produces that is collaborated with different category of businesses. For example, a plan case that is the collaboration with Masamichi Katayama, a Japanese architect, and a camera case that is the collaboration with Ichigo Sugawara, a Japanese photographer and so on.

Porter collaborated with Eric Clapton and C.F. Martin & Company and produced a pouch that is an extra item for a limited guitar.

A collaboration brand to support the artist Yusuke Yoshimura, which is named Yusuke Shimura Tokyo New York, was launched in 2006.

References

External links
Official Website
Interview of Teruyuki Yoshida (in Japanese)

Bags (fashion)
Fashion accessory brands
Manufacturing companies based in Tokyo
Japanese brands
Luggage brands
Luggage manufacturers
Leather manufacturers
Manufacturing companies established in 1935
Japanese companies established in 1935